NightCaster: Defeat the Darkness is a third-person, single-player, action-adventure game for the Xbox, developed by VR1 Entertainment and published by Microsoft. Players take the role of Arran, a novice wizard whose magical power grows as he ages throughout his quest to collect spells and rid the world of eternal night. NightCaster was released on December 26, 2001, and its ESRB rating is Teen.

In December 2002, the sequel, NightCaster II: Equinox, was released, with two-player compatibility.

Plot summary
The start of the story mode introduces the player to Arran, a young boy living in a small village. One day, Arran creeps into a forest whilst playing hide and seek with his friends, and stumbles upon a glowing floating orb. The orb informs him that he must go on a quest to defeat the evil 'Night Caster'. Arran is then placed in suspended animation (even though he still ages) by the orb, presumably so that he 'will be ready' to fight the Nightcaster.

Arran wakes up, having aged to around the mid-twenties, to find his world devastated by darkness and the legions of monsters under the reign of the Nightcaster spreading terror over the populace. Arran's parents are supposedly dead when Arran finds his home to be a smoldering wreckage, at which point the orb informs him that 'it is the Nightcaster['s doing]'. So he starts his quest facing many creatures and as he ages his spells are stronger, more effective and more expansive.

Gameplay
The player directly controls Arran from a third person perspective. Spells are aimed using the orb (who also is the guide character who provides narration and objectives). There are four classes of spells: fire, water, light, and dark. Creatures have varying degrees of vulnerability to each type of spell (a "dark" creature is more vulnerable to light spells). As the player progresses, Arran finds more spells, and can cast them at higher levels by charging them.

Reception

The game received "mixed" reviews according to the review aggregation website Metacritic.

References

External links
 

2001 video games
Action-adventure games
Fantasy video games
Microsoft games
Xbox games
Xbox-only games
Video games developed in the United States